Dyckia mezii is a species of stiff-leaved thorny plant in the genus Dyckia. This species is native to Brazil. Dyckia argentea is an illegitimate name for the same species.

References

mezii
Flora of Brazil